Macchiedo was a Dalmatian Italian family from Hvar. signori Girolamo Macchiedo and Giovanni Macchiedo were members of the Diet of Dalmatia, the regional assembly of the Kingdom of Dalmatia within the Austro-Hungarian Empire.

References

Dalmatian Italians
People from Hvar
Kingdom of Dalmatia
19th-century Italian people
Austro-Hungarian politicians
Italian-language surnames
Italian families